Astrauskas  is a Lithuanian language family name. It corresponds to Polish Ostrowski, Russian Ostrovsky, Belarusian Astrouski and American Girard and is generally translated as meaning “he without sleeves”

The surname may refer to:
Rimantas Astrauskas, Lithuanian physicist, ecologist and politician
Nerijus Astrauskas, Lithuanian football striker

Lithuanian-language surnames